34th district of Czech senate is based in Liberec. The Seat is currently held by Michael Canov.

Senators

Election results

1996 election

1998 election

2004 election

2010 election

2016 election

References

34